North Benfleet is a village and former civil parish, now in the parish of Bowers Gifford and North Benfleet, in the Basildon borough of Essex, England, located between the towns of Basildon to the west and Thundersley to the east. It adjoins the small village of Bowers Gifford and is adjacent to the town of South Benfleet. In 1931 the parish had a population of 560. On 1 January 1937 the parish was abolished to form Billericay.

Although it had fallen into disrepair after many years of disuse, it was returned to regular use in March 2013 by the Orthodox Church, and now has weekly services.

References

External links
 Basildon Heritage
 Basildon Borough History - Bowers Gifford & North Benfleet
 Bowers Gifford & North Benfleet Parish Council
 Bowers Gifford & North Benfleet Residents Association
 Essex Churches - All Saints, North Benfleet

Villages in Essex
Former civil parishes in Essex
Borough of Basildon